Ilkeston is a former United Kingdom Parliamentary constituency. It was a constituency of the House of Commons of the Parliament of the United Kingdom. It was represented by one Member of Parliament. In 1983 it was abolished, together with South East Derbyshire, when the Derbyshire county constituencies were redrawn - the constituencies of Amber Valley and Erewash were created and the constituency of South Derbyshire was re-created.

Boundaries
1885–1918: The Sessional Division of Smalley, and the parishes of Breaston, Draycott and Wilne, Hopwell, Longeaton, Ockbrook, Risley, and Sawley and Wilsthorpe in the Sessional Division of Derby.

1918–1950: The Municipal Borough of Ilkeston, the Urban Districts of Heanor and Ripley, and the Rural District which consisted of the parishes of Codnor Park and Shipley.

1950–1983: The Municipal Borough of Ilkeston, the Urban Districts of Alfreton, Heanor, and Ripley, and in the Rural District of Belper the parish of Shipley.

Members of Parliament

Elections

Elections in the 1880s 

Watson's death caused a by-election.

Elections in the 1890s

Elections in the 1900s

Elections in the 1910s 

General Election 1914–15:

Another General Election was required to take place before the end of 1915. The political parties had been making preparations for an election to take place and by the July 1914, the following candidates had been selected; 
Liberal: John Seely 
Unionist: William Marshall Freeman

Elections in the 1920s

Elections in the 1930s

Elections in the 1940s 
General Election 1939–40:
Another General Election was required to take place before the end of 1940. The political parties had been making preparations for an election to take place from 1939 and by the end of this year, the following candidates had been selected; 
Labour:  George Oliver
Conservative: 
Liberal:

Elections in the 1950s

Elections in the 1960s

Elections in the 1970s

See also
List of former United Kingdom Parliament constituencies
Unreformed House of Commons

References

Parliamentary constituencies in Derbyshire (historic)
Constituencies of the Parliament of the United Kingdom established in 1885
Constituencies of the Parliament of the United Kingdom disestablished in 1983